Rea Vaya (which means "we are going" in Scamto) is a bus rapid transit system operating in Johannesburg, South Africa. It opened in phases starting on 30 August 2009. Rea Vaya links the Johannesburg CBD and Braamfontein with Soweto. It is currently expanding towards Sandton, Rosebank and Midrand as well. It is one of the first bus rapid transit systems in Africa.

Routes

Rea Vaya routes are divided into three classifications: trunk routes on the main highways and between major destinations; complementary routes running on circular routes that connect to trunks; and feeder routes that radiate out from trunk routes to outlying suburbs.

 the following routes are in operation:

Trunk routes:
 T1: Thokoza Park (Soweto) to Johannesburg CBD and Ellis Park East (Doornfontein)
 T2: Thokoza Park to Ellis Park East via Civic Centre (Braamfontein)
 T3: Thokoza Park to Parktown and Library Gardens East

Complementary routes:
 C1: Dobsonville (Soweto) to CBD and Ellis Park East
 C2: Dobsonville to Maponya Mall
 C3: Inner City Loop - Chancellor House to Johannesburg Art Gallery
 C4: Windsor West and Cresta to Parktown and Inner City
 C5: Florida North to Parktown and Library Gardens
 C6: Meadowlands to Millpark

Feeder routes in Soweto and adjacent areas:
 F1: Naledi to Thokoza Park to CBD
 F2: Protea Glen to Thokoza Park to CBD
 F3: Jabavu to Lake View to CBD
 F4: Mofolo to Boomtown to CBD
 F5: Eldorado Park to Lake View to CBD
 F6: Lea Glen to Bosmont
 F7: Amalgam to Bosmont Station
 F8: Westbury Station to Greymont
 F9: Mapetla to Thokoza Park
 F10: Pimville to Lakeview
 F11: Bellevue/Yeoville to City
 F12: Parktown distribution route

Strike action
As of February 2014, there have been three strikes which have disrupted service of the transit system.

References

External links
 Official website

Transport in Johannesburg
Bus rapid transit in Africa
Rapid transit in South Africa